Turris farouqui is an extinct species of sea snail, a marine gastropod mollusk in the family Turridae, the turrids.

Description
The length of the shell attains 28 mm.

Distribution
Fossils of this species were found in Vindobonian strata at Geneifa, Egypt.

References

farouqui
Gastropods described in 1977